The Fokker S.IX was a military trainer aircraft produced in the Netherlands in the mid-1930s, designed at a Royal Netherlands Navy request for a machine to replace the obsolete Fokker S.IIIs then in service. It was a conventional, single-bay biplane with staggered wings of unequal span braced with N-struts. The pilot and instructor sat in tandem, open cockpits and the undercarriage was of fixed, tailskid type with divided main units. The wing had a wooden structure, the fuselage one of welded steel tube, and the entire aircraft was fabric-covered.

The Navy approved the design and ordered 27 aircraft, later reducing this to 15. The Royal Netherlands Army Aviation Group ordered 20 examples with a different engine, following this with an order for a second batch of 20. None of these latter aircraft were delivered by the time of the German invasion of the Netherlands in 1940. On 14 May that year, a few surviving Army S.IXs escaped to France alongside some S.IVs, but never flew again.

Following the war, air charter company Frits Diepen Vliegtuigen ordered three more aircraft, which were used to train pilots into the 1950s.

Variants
 S.IX/1 - version with Armstrong Siddeley Genet Major engine for Army
 S.IX/2 - version with Menasco Buccaneer engine for Navy

Operators

Royal Netherlands Air Force
Royal Netherlands Navy

Specifications (S.IX/1)

References

 
 

1930s Dutch military trainer aircraft
S.IX
Aircraft first flown in 1937
Single-engined tractor aircraft
Biplanes